Bilge Umar (born 1936) is a Turkish writer, researcher and jurist born in Karşıyaka, İzmir, Turkey.

He did his studies in Istanbul University Law School, where he also worked, after graduation in 1958, as an assistant and received his doctorate degree in 1962, with a thesis entitled Annulment Suit under Turkish Enforcement-Bankruptcy Law becoming an Associate Professor in 1967. Then he moved back to İzmir and held various managerial posts in İzmir's Ege University, as aside a career as an academician. He became one of the founders of the university's Law School, where he became the deputy to the dean, and a full professor in 1970. Prof. Dr. Bilge Umar is currently the Head of the Department of Public Law of Yeditepe University (İstanbul) Faculty of Law and is teaching "Civil Procedure Law" and "Appeal Procedure and Arbitration".

As much as his studies in various legal matters, he came to be known in Turkey for his popular books on ancient history (particularly on ancient cities in Turkey).

Books
 Aeolis / Bir Tarihsel Coğrafya Araştırması ve Gezi Rehberi (A historico-geographical research and a guidebook) 
 Bithynia / (A historico-geographical research and a guidebook), 
 Börklüce, 
 Ionia / (A historico-geographical research and a guidebook), 
 İlkçağda Türkiye Halkı (Prehistorical peoples in Turkey), 
 İzmir 1950-1999, 
 İzmir'de Yunanlıların Son Günleri (Last days of Greeks in İzmir), 1974 Ankara, 
 Karadeniz Kapadokyası Pontus (Pontus, the Cappadocia of the Black Sea), 
 Caria / (A historico-geographical research and a guidebook), 
 Cilicia / (A historico-geographical research and a guidebook), 
 Lydia / (A historico-geographical research and a guidebook), 
 Lykia / (A historico-geographical research and a guidebook), 
 Trakya (Thrace), 
 Troy / (A historico-geographical research and a guidebook), 
 Türkiye Halkının Ortaçağ Tarihi / Türkiye Türkleri Ulusunun Oluşması (History of the people of Turkey in the Middle Ages / Formation of a Turkish Nation in Turkey), 
 Türkiye'deki Tarihsel Adlar (Historical names around Turkey), 
 Türkiye'deki Tarihsel Anıtlar (Historical monuments around Turkey), 
 Yunanlıların ve Anadolu Rumlarının Anlatımıyla İzmir Savaşı (The war around İzmir as told by Greeks and Hellenic Anatolians), 
 Ege'nin Kapadokyası Bafa Gölü (Lake Bafa, the Cappadocia of the Aegean Region'')

Translations
 Niebelungerlied, Les chansons de Roland, Alexiades, and other.

Turkish non-fiction writers
Academic staff of Yeditepe University
Turkish legal scholars
Turkish women academics
Academic staff of Ege University
1936 births
People from İzmir
Living people
Istanbul University Faculty of Law alumni
Academic staff of Istanbul University